Kent Masters King (born August 5, 1974) is an American actress known for her appearances on the daytime soap opera General Hospital.

Early life

Kent was born and raised in Los Angeles, California. Her father, Dr. Richard D. King, is an Egyptologist and her mother is a former actress. She studied filmmaking at the University of Southern California, where she majored in Cinema and Television and graduated in 1996.

Career
Kent began her career as Julie Williams on the primetime soap opera Knots Landing (1988-1992). She filled in for Victoria Rowell in 2000 when Rowell took a hiatus from The Young and the Restless, then joined Port Charles briefly in 2003 as the mysterious and beautiful Imani. She began a recurring role as Dr. Lainey Winters on General Hospital on April 1, 2005, and was upgraded to contract status in December 2005. In 2007, King became an original cast member of the General Hospital prime-time spin-off General Hospital: Night Shift while maintaining her day job on GH. On June 1, 2008, King was taken off contract with General Hospital, and became a recurring cast member once again.

Kent is the daughter of Egyptologist and actress Alfreda Masters (who spent many years as an extra General Hospital at the nurses' station), and was named for an Egyptian goddess.

Filmography

Film

Television

Music Video

References

External links

Kent Masters King: Body of Bojuka @ Soap Opera Digest

1974 births
Actresses from Los Angeles
American film actresses
American soap opera actresses
Living people
USC School of Cinematic Arts alumni
African-American actresses
American television actresses
21st-century African-American people
21st-century African-American women
20th-century African-American people
20th-century African-American women